Beaty-Spivey House is a historic home located at Conway in Horry County, South Carolina.  It was built about 1870 and is a -story, cross-gable-roofed frame residence sheathed in weatherboard. It features a projecting gable with a half-story above and three-bay porch with four tapering, octagonal, freestanding posts and recessed porch at the first story.

It was listed on the National Register of Historic Places in 1986.

References

External links
Beaty--Spivey House - Conway, South Carolina - U.S. National Register of Historic Places on Waymarking.com

Houses on the National Register of Historic Places in South Carolina
Houses completed in 1870
Houses in Horry County, South Carolina
National Register of Historic Places in Horry County, South Carolina
Buildings and structures in Conway, South Carolina